The 1995 Superclub competition was the third and final season of a nationwide association football club competition in New Zealand. It was won by Waitakere City.

Structure
The competition was divided into three stages. In the first phase three regional round-robin leagues were played, with each team playing every other team home and away. The top teams from this stage progressed to a national league; the bottom teams were relegated to lower regional leagues. The Northern and Southern Leagues each contained ten teams, the Central League contained eleven.

The top eight teams (three from the northern and central regions and two from the southern region) then took part in the national league stage, with each team playing every other team once. Finally, the top four teams played a knockout competition to decide the champion. This involved the top two teams from the national league phase playing each other, and third and fourth place also playing each other. The winner of the match between first and second progressed through to the final; the loser of that match met the winner of the other match to decide the other finalist.

There was considerable reorganisation of the regional leagues at the end of the 1995 season, with several teams withdrawing from the following season's league. This fact, coupled with the clearly reduced standard of play in the national stage of the competition (diluted by the large number of teams involved in the competition) led to the creation of a new interim league, the National Summer Soccer League, which began in 1996.

Regional leagues

Northern League

Central League

Southern League

National League

League table

Knockout phase

Playoffs

*Waikato United won 5-4 on penalties

Final

References

New Zealand Superclub League seasons
1
New Zealand